Timothy Agoglia Carey (March 11, 1929 – May 11, 1994) was an American film and television character actor.   Carey was best known for portraying manic or violent characters who are driven to extremes.

Career

He made his screen debut with a minor role in Billy Wilder's 1951 movie Ace in the Hole (alternately titled The Big Carnival). One of Carey's most recognized early roles is in the 1956 Stanley Kubrick film The Killing, in which he portrays a gunman hired to shoot a racehorse as a diversion from a racetrack robbery. Kubrick then cast him in his next film, the World War I drama Paths of Glory (1957), as one of three soldiers accused of cowardice.

During the filming of Paths of Glory, Carey was reportedly disruptive and tried to draw more attention to his character. Due to this behavior, a scene in which Carey and the other actors were served a duck dinner as a final meal before execution took 57 takes to complete. Carey then faked his own kidnapping to generate personal publicity, which prompted Kubrick and producer James B. Harris to fire him. As a result, the film does not depict the three condemned soldiers during the battle scene, and a double was used during a scene in which a priest hears Carey's character's confession. The scene was filmed with the double's back to the camera.

The 1957 film Bayou (later retitled Poor White Trash) features one of Carey's few leading roles, as a demented Cajun shopkeeper named Ulysses. Carey also has roles in East of Eden, The Wild One, One-Eyed Jacks, The Boy and the Pirates, Bikini Beach, Beach Blanket Bingo and the John Cassavetes–directed films Minnie and Moskowitz and The Killing of a Chinese Bookie.

Francis Ford Coppola was eager to cast Carey as Luca Brasi in The Godfather, but Carey turned down the part so he could film a television pilot called "Tweet’s Ladies of Pasadena", which was never sold or broadcast. The proposed TV show starred Carey as a character named Tweet Twig, who could bring animals back from the dead.

He plays a minor role as the Angel of Death in the comedy film D.C. Cab, and appears in the Monkees self-parody musical comedy Head. His final appearance is in the 1986 movie Echo Park. Carey also did a select amount of acting on television from the 1950s through the 1980s.

According to director Quentin Tarantino, Carey auditioned for the role of Joe Cabot in Tarantino's Reservoir Dogs. Although Carey did not get the role, the screenplay is dedicated to him, among others.

Carey's face (from the movie The Killing) is positioned behind George Harrison on the cover of the Beatles album Sgt. Pepper's Lonely Hearts Club Band. Although Carey's image does not appear on the commercially released version of the cover, it can be seen on outtake photos from the Sgt. Pepper session.

Carey also portrays the character Charles Buster Rilla, a deranged gunman, in the 1966 episode “Quaker Girl” (S12E12) on the long-running Western Gunsmoke. He has a minor role as well as Bert in "Ransom for a Dead Man", a pilot for the series Columbo, which guest-stars Lee Grant and originally aired on March 1, 1971. Carey reprised that role in the Columbo episode "Dead Weight", which guest-stars Eddie Albert and Suzanne Pleshette and was first broadcast on October 27, 1971.

The World's Greatest Sinner
Carey wrote, produced, directed, and starred in the 1962 feature The World's Greatest Sinner, whose music soundtrack was scored by a young, pre-Mothers of Invention Frank Zappa. Although it did not have wide commercial release, the film achieved cult status through repeated screenings at the "midnight movies" in Los Angeles in the 1960s. During a 1963 appearance on The Steve Allen Show during which he generated musical sounds on bicycles, Zappa talked about scoring the soundtrack for The World's Greatest Sinner, which he called "the world's worst movie."

The movie was featured as a midnight show at the TCM Festival in Hollywood in April 2018. His son Romeo Carey introduced the film.

Personal life
Carey was born in Bay Ridge, Brooklyn to a family of Italian and Irish descent.

Carey and his wife Doris had six children: Romeo, Mario, Velencia, Silvana, Dagmar, and Germain.

Carey died of a stroke in 1994 at the age of 65 in Los Angeles. His body is interred at Rose Hills Memorial Park in Whittier, California.

Partial filmography

 Ace in the Hole (a.k.a. The Big Carnival) (1951)
 Across the Wide Missouri (1951) – Baptiste DuNord (uncredited)
 Hellgate (1952) – Wyand (uncredited)
 Bloodhounds of Broadway (1952) – Crockett Pace (uncredited)
 White Witch Doctor (1953) – Jarrett
 Crime Wave (1953) – Johnny Haslett (uncredited)
 The Wild One (1953) – Chino's Boy #1 (uncredited)
 Alaska Seas (1954) – Wycoff
 East of Eden (1955) – Joe (uncredited)
 Finger Man (1955) – Lou Terpe
 Francis in the Navy (1955) – Auctioneer's Helper (uncredited)
 I'll Cry Tomorrow (1955) – Derelict (uncredited)
 The Killing (1956) – Nikki Arcane
 Francis in the Haunted House (1956) – Hugo
 The Last Wagon (1956) – Cole Harper (uncredited)
 Flight to Hong Kong (1956) – Lagarto 
 Rumble on the Docks (1956) – Frank Mangus
 Bayou (a.k.a. Poor White Trash) (1957) – Ulysses
 House of Numbers (1957) – Frenchy – Arnie's Cell Mate (uncredited)
 Paths of Glory (1957) – Private Maurice Ferol
 Unwed Mother (1958) – Doctor
 Revolt in the Big House (1958) – Ed 'Bugsy' Kyle
 The Gunfight at Dodge City (1959) – Forbes, Regan's Deputy (uncredited)
 The Boy and the Pirates (1960) – Morgan
 One-Eyed Jacks (1961) – Howard Tetley
 The Second Time Around (1961) – Bonner
 The World's Greatest Sinner (1962) – Clarence Hilliard
 Mermaids of Tiburon (1962) – Milo Sangster
 Convicts 4 (1962) – Nick
 Shock Treatment (1964) – Hulking Patient (uncredited)
 Bikini Beach (1964) – South Dakota Slim
 Rio Conchos (1964) – Chico (uncredited)
 Beach Blanket Bingo (1965) – South Dakota Slim
 Duel at Diablo (1966) – Deputy Clem (uncredited)
 A Time for Killing (1967) – Billy Cat
 Waterhole No. 3 (1967) – Hilb
 Head (1968) – Lord High 'n Low
 Change of Habit (1969) – Ajax Market Manager (uncredited)
 Tweet's Ladies of Pasadena (1970) – Tweet Twig
 What's the Matter with Helen? (1971) – The Tramp
 Minnie and Moskowitz (1971) – Morgan Morgan 
 Get to Know Your Rabbit (1972) – Policeman (uncredited)
 The Outfit (1973) – Jake Menner
 Peeper (1976) – Sid 
 The Killing of a Chinese Bookie (1976) – Flo
 Chesty Anderson, USN (1976) – Vincent 
 Speedtrap (1977) – Loomis
 Hard Knocks (1979)
 Fast-Walking (1982) – Bullet
 D.C. Cab (1983) – Angel Of Death
 Echo Park (1985) – Vinnie

References

External links
 
 
 Psychotronic Video Magazine 1990 interview with Timothy Carey
 Cashiers du Cinemart profile
 "The Brooklyn Cajun: Timothy Carey in Poor White Trash", by Jim Knipfel, at The Chiseler

1929 births
1994 deaths
20th-century American male actors
American male film actors
American male television actors
American people of Irish descent
American people of Italian descent
Burials at Rose Hills Memorial Park
Male actors from Los Angeles
Male actors from New York City
People from Bay Ridge, Brooklyn